Brian Robertson may refer to:

Brian Robertson, 1st Baron Robertson of Oakridge (1896–1974), British World War II general, later Chairman of the British Transport Commission
Brian James (guitarist) (Brian Robertson, born 1950), English punk rock guitarist formerly of The Damned and The Lords of the New Church
Brian Robertson (guitarist) (born 1956), Scottish guitarist
BA Robertson (Brian Alexander Robertson, born 1956), Scottish musician and songwriter
Brian Robertson (rugby union) (born 1959), Scottish rugby union player and coach
Brian Robertson (born 1979), American trombonist with the band Suburban Legends

See also
 Bryan Robertson (1925–2002), English curator and arts manager
 Robertson (surname)
 Brian Roberts (disambiguation)